These are a list of player and club records for Bradford City Association Football Club.

Honours

League
Division One
Runners-up (1): 1998–99
Division Two
Winners (1): 1907–08
Play-off winners (1): 1995–96
Division Three
Winners (1): 1984–85
Division Three (North)
Winners (1): 1928–29
Division Four
Runners-up (1): 1981–82

Cup

FA Cup
Winners (1): 1911
Football League Cup
Runners-up(1): 2013
Third Division North Challenge Cup
Winners (1): 1939
Runners-up (1): 1938

Player records

Youngest and oldest
Youngest player: 15 years 332 days – Reece Staunton v Rotherham United, 7 November 2017.
Oldest player: 41 years 178 days – Neville Southall v Leeds United, 12 March 2000.

Most appearances

The following players have played more than 300 league appearances for Bradford City.

Most appearances : 574 – Ces Podd.

Goalscorers
Most goals in a season: 36 – David Layne, 1961–62.
Most league goals in a season: 34 – David Layne, 1961–62.
Most goals scored in a match: 7 – Albert Whitehurst v Tranmere Rovers, Division Three (North), 6 March 1929.
Most goals scored : 143 – Bobby Campbell.

Top goalscorers
The following players have scored more than 60 league goals for Bradford City.

Transfers

Record transfer fees paid
The following players are all the players for whom Bradford City have paid at least £1 million.

Record transfer fees received

Highest transfer fee received: £2 million – Des Hamilton, to Newcastle United, March 1997.
Highest transfer fee received: £2 million – Andy O'Brien, to Newcastle United, March 2001.

Managerial records

First manager: Robert Campbell (managed the club for 79 matches from June 1903 to October 1905).
Longest serving manager: Peter O'Rourke (managed the club for 497 matches from November 1905 to June 1921).

Club records

Goals
Most league goals scored in a season: 128 in 42 matches – Division Three (North), 1928–29.
Fewest league goals scored in a season: 30 in 38 matches – Premiership, 2000–01.
Most league goals conceded in a season: 94 in 42 matches – Division Two, 1936–37.
Most league goals conceded in a season: 94 in 46 matches – Division Four, 1965–66.
Fewest league goals conceded in a season: 40 in 46 matches – League One, 2015 - 16.

Points
Most points in a season
Two points for a win: 63 in 42 matches – Division Three (North), 1928–29.
Three points for a win: 94 in 46 matches – Division Three, 1984–85.
Fewest points in a season
Two points for a win: 23 in 42 matches – Division Two, 1926–27.
Three points for a win: 26 in 38 matches – Premiership, 2000–01.

Matches

Firsts
First league match: Grimsby Town 2–0 Bradford City, Division Two at Blundell Park, 1 September 1903.
First FA Cup match: Bradford City 6–1 Rockingham Colliery, first round qualifying at Valley Parade, 3 October 1903.
First League Cup match: Bradford City 2–1 Manchester United, second round at Valley Parade, 2 November 1960.
First European match: FK Atlantas 1–3 Bradford City, Intertoto Cup second round at Žalgiris Stadium, 2 July 2000.

Record victories
Record league victory: 11–1 v Rotherham United, Division Three (North), 25 August 1928.
Record FA Cup victory: 11–3 v Walker Celtic, first round replay, 1 December 1937.
Record League Cup victory: 7–2 v Darlington, second round second leg, 25 September 2000.

Record defeats
Record league defeat: 0–8 v Manchester City, Division Two, 7 May 1927.
Record league defeat: 1–9 v Colchester United, Division Four, 30 December 1961.
Record FA Cup defeat: 1–6 v Newcastle United, third round, 7 March 1963.
Record FA Cup defeat: 0–5 v Burnley, fifth round replay, 3 February 1960.
Record FA Cup defeat: 0–5 v Tottenham Hotspur, third round, 7 January 1970.

Record consecutive results
Record consecutive wins: 10 – (from 26 November 1983 to 3 February 1984.
Record consecutive defeats: 8 – (21 January 1933 to 11 March 1933.
Record consecutive games without a defeat: 21 – (from 11 January 1969 to 2 May 1969).
Record consecutive games without a win: 16 – (from 28 August 1948 to 20 November 1948).

Attendances
Highest attendance at home match (Valley Parade): 39,146 v Burnley, FA Cup fourth round, 11 March 1911.
Lowest attendance at home match (Valley Parade): 931 v Rotherham United, English Football League Trophy, 7 November 2017.
Record gate receipts: £181,990 v Manchester United, Premiership, 13 January 2001.

European record
Bradford City's record in European competitions is limited to the 2000 Intertoto Cup, for which they took England's second place.

References

Records and Statistics
Bradford City